Elections were held in the organized municipalities in the Rainy River District of Ontario on October 27, 2014 in conjunction with municipal elections across the province.

Alberton

Atikokan

Chapple

Dawson

Emo

Fort Frances

Lake of the Woods

La Vallee

Morley

Rainy River

References 

Rainy River
Rainy River District